Ruby Starr, born Constance Henrietta Mierzwiak in Toledo, Ohio (November 30, 1949 - January 14, 1995), was a rock singer and recording artist who attained national prominence in the 1970s and 1980s, including for her work with Black Oak Arkansas.

Childhood and early career 
Constance was born to parents Richard Joseph “Dick” Mierzwiak and Henrietta. Her siblings were Richard Jr., and Suzanne Bonita. Known as "Connie" to her family, Starr began performing at the age of nine, singing country music under the stage name Connie Little. Her early bands included Connie and the Blu-Beats, The Downtowners and the Blue Grange Ramblers.

Recording artist 
She joined the band Ruby Jones in 1969.  In 1971 they were signed to Curtom Records and recorded their first album, Ruby Jones. Shortly after that album's release, Black Oak Arkansas lead vocalist Jim "Dandy" Mangrum was partying after a concert in Evansville, Indiana at a club called the Golden Record, where she was performing. He asked her on the spot to join the band.  At this point she assumed the stage name of Ruby Starr.

Starr toured with Black Oak Arkansas for several years at the height of their success. She was featured in their 1973 Top 30 single "Jim Dandy".  In 1974, she began touring on her own again as Ruby Starr & Grey Ghost (members: Gary Levin, Marius Penczner, David Mayo and Joel Williams) and released an eponymous album in 1975, on Capitol Records.  Her second album, Scene Stealer, also on Capitol Records, was released in 1976.  During this time she continued to open for Black Oak Arkansas and other acts such as Black Sabbath and Edgar Winter.  Starr also toured with Blackfoot from 1977 to 1978.  Her third and last album for Capitol, Smoky Places, was released in 1977.

By the late 1970s, Starr had made Milwaukee her home town and was a popular act in clubs in the region. By the early 1980s, Starr had formed a new band called "Grey Star" by joining with a band that performed in and around Mayville, Wisconsin called "Lucy Grey", featuring Dave "Mud Slide" Gruenewaldt on the drums. They issued several recordings which included 1981's Grey Star  and 1983's Telephone Sex. Starr formed her final road band, "Henrietta Kahn", in the late 1980s.

British band Sons Of Liberty recorded a track on their Aces And Fights album appropriately called Ruby Starr.

Las Vegas period 
In the early 1990s, Starr quit the road and moved to Las Vegas, playing at casino/hotels on the Strip such as the Riviera and the Stardust as well as local clubs. During this period, The Ruby Star Band also performed as the opening act for Kansas, The Fabulous Thunderbirds and April Wine. Shortly after she was chosen to perform in the Country Legends show at the Aladdin Hotel in Las Vegas, she learned she had cancer.

Death 
After being diagnosed with lung cancer and a brain tumor, Starr returned home to her family in Toledo where she died at age 45.
After her death, several archival releases that featured Starr were issued, including the live Black Oak Arkansas recording, Live On The King Biscuit Flower Hour 1976, and a reissue of Ruby Jones's debut album, retitled as Stone Junkie. The song "Ruby", by Raging Slab, is in memory of her.

Discography

Albums
Ruby Jones (under the group name "Ruby Jones") (Curtom 1971) 
Ruby Starr & Grey Ghost (Capitol 1975)
Scene Stealer (Capitol 1976)
Smokey Places (Capitol 1977)
Grey-Star by Grey-Star featuring Ruby Starr (R&C Emotion Records 1981)
Toledo's Best Rock compilation album by WIOT-FM "FM 104" from Toledo OH, featuring one track, "Hear It On The Radio" by Ruby Jones (Pacer Records, 8103, 1981)
Telephone Sex by Grey-Star featuring Ruby Starr (1983)
Stone Junkie (Sequel 2000) (re-release of the 1971 Ruby Jones album)
The Lost Tapes (The Legacy Edition) (Cabal Records 2022)
 The Lost Tapes (The Bonus Tracks) (Cabal Records 2022)
 The Early Years 1961-1969 (Cabal Records 2023)

With Black Oak Arkansas
High on the Hog (Atco 1973)
Street Party (Atco 1974)
Balls Of Fire (MCA 1976)
10 Yr. Overnight Success (MCA 1976)
Live On The King Biscuit Flower Hour 1976 (King Biscuit Flower Hour/BMG 1998)

References

External links

1949 births
1995 deaths
American Southern Rock musicians
20th-century American singers
20th-century American women singers
American women rock singers
Deaths from lung cancer
Deaths from brain cancer in the United States
Deaths from cancer in Ohio
Singers from Ohio